Tamarisk, or Tamarisk House, is a house belonging to the Duchy of Cornwall, on St Mary's in the Isles of Scilly, in the United Kingdom off the coast of Cornwall.

The house is a cottage built in brick in the mid 1960s, standing in a plot of a quarter of an acre, largely hidden from view by tamarisk trees. Before King Charles III (then Prince of Wales and Duke of Cornwall) separated from Diana, Princess of Wales, they spent holidays in the Isles of Scilly but preferred to stay with friends on Tresco.

As of 2022, the house is being used as a holiday let operated by the Duchy of Cornwall.

Most of the rural portions of the Isles of Scilly are owned by the Duchy of Cornwall, although most properties in Hugh Town, the largest settlement in the islands, were sold to inhabitants by King George VI in 1949, and the island of Tresco has been leased to the Dorrien Smith family since 1834.

Tamarisks are deciduous flowering shrubs which grow in thickets. They are rarely seen on the English mainland, but flourish in the warmer climate of the Isles of Scilly.

References 

Charles III
Duchy of Cornwall
Buildings and structures in the Isles of Scilly
Royal residences in the United Kingdom
St Mary's, Isles of Scilly